"Always Be" is the second single from Jimmy Eat World's sixth studio album Chase This Light. The song impacted radio on December 4, 2007. The single was released in the U.K on March 3, 2008.

Critical reception
Slant Magazine's Jonathan Keefe praised the song's use of "snaps and handclaps" and compared its melody to the highlights on both The Shins' Wincing the Night Away and Shout Out Louds' Our Ill Wills. In a negative review for the album, Andrew Blackie from PopMatters criticized the track for being "gimmicky and insincere."

Music video
The band began filming the video on January 5, 2008. A 30-second clip was soon added to Jimmy Eat World's official website, as well as the clip being shown on MTV Two, and then on January 27, it was announced the video would premiere on MTV TRL on January 30 at 3.30pm.

The video follows a school trip to a science museum which mainly focuses on a boy and girl who come to like each other by the end of the video. As the band plays, the two find themselves separated from their tour group and run around the museum, playing with the displays until they catch up with the rest of their classmates.

The full video is now available to watch on YouTube and download on iTunes. It was directed by the Malloys. The video was filmed at the Natural History Museum in Los Angeles, California.

Track listing
iTunes EP

 "Always Be"
 "Firefight" (Tempe Sessions)
 "Big Casino" (live)
 "Always Be" (live)

7" Vinyl

 "Always Be"
 "Big Casino" (live)

CD

 "Always Be"
 "Firefight" (Tempe Sessions)

Charts

References

External links
Always Be Lyrics

2007 singles
2008 singles
Jimmy Eat World songs
Song recordings produced by Butch Vig
Music videos directed by The Malloys
2007 songs
Interscope Records singles